Well Kept Secret is John Martyn's second and final album for WEA. It was released in 1982. "Never Let Me Go" featured Ronnie Scott on saxophone. Recorded at RAK Studios, London.

Track listing
All tracks composed by John Martyn except where indicated.

"Could've Been Me"  – 3:44  
"You Might Need a Man" – 3:09 
"Hung Up" – 3:58 
"Gun Money" – 5:01 
"Never Let Me Go" (Joseph Scott)  – 2:48 
"Love Up" – 3:19 
"Changes Her Mind" – 4:35  
"Hiss on the Tape" – 3:59 
"Back with a Vengeance" – 3:08 
"Livin' Alone"  – 3:27

Personnel
John Martyn - guitar, vocals
Jeff Allen - drums
Danny Cummings - drums, percussion
Jim Prime - keyboards
Alan Thomson - bass
Mel Collins - saxophone, flute
Ronnie Scott - saxophone on "Never Let Me Go"
Martin Drover - trumpet
Geraint Watkins - keyboards, piano, accordion
Pete Wingfield - keyboards on "Changes Her Mind"
Andy Duncan - drums on "Changes Her Mind" and "Back with a Vengeance"
Technical
Phil Thornalley - engineer
Mike Nocito - recording
Bill Smith - sleeve
Andrew Douglas - photography

References

External links
The Official John Martyn Website

John Martyn albums
1982 albums
Warner Records albums